Penstemon labrosus is a species of penstemon known by the common name San Gabriel beardtongue. It is native to the Transverse Ranges of southern California, including the San Gabriel Mountains, and the Peninsular Ranges to the south, its distribution extending into Mexico. It grows in forest and woodland habitat. It is a perennial herb growing erect to about 70 centimeters tall. The long, paired leaves are linear in shape with rolled, untoothed edges, and reach over 8 centimeters in maximum length. The inflorescence produces bright red to orange or yellowish flowers 3 to 4 centimeters long. The upper lip is hood-shaped and the lower is divided into 3 narrow lobes which are sometimes reflexed. The flower is hairless, including the staminode.

External links
Jepson Manual Treatment
Photo gallery

labrosus
Flora of Baja California
Flora of California
Flora without expected TNC conservation status